The 5th Annual Tranny Awards was a pornographic awards event recognizing the best in transgender pornography form the previous year from November 1, 2011 to 31 October 2012. the nominees were announced on December 21 2012, online on the trannyawards.com website. The winners were announced during the awards on February 17, 2013.

The winners were decided by a mixture a panel of industry judges and fan voting. This was the fifth awards dedicated to recognising achievements in transgender pornography. Steven Grooby the founder of the awards stated that he wanted to address the lack of representation of transgender performers in awards.

Winners and nominees
The nominations for the 5th Tranny Awards were announced online and opened to fan voting on December 21 2012, online on the trannyawards.com website. The winners were announced during the awards on February 17, 2013.

Awards
Winners are listed first, highlighted in boldface.

References

Transgender Erotica Awards
Pornographic film awards
21st-century awards
American pornographic film awards
Annual events in the United States
Awards established in 2008
Culture of Los Angeles
Adult industry awards